This is a list of the mammal species recorded in Mauritius. Of the mammal species in Mauritius, one is critically endangered, three are vulnerable, and one is considered to be extinct.

The following tags are used to highlight each species' conservation status as assessed by the International Union for Conservation of Nature:

Some species were assessed using an earlier set of criteria. Species assessed using this system have the following instead of near threatened and least concern categories:

Order: Sirenia (manatees and dugongs) 

Sirenia is an order of fully aquatic, herbivorous mammals that inhabit rivers, estuaries, coastal marine waters, swamps, and marine wetlands. All four species are endangered.

Family: Dugongidae
Genus: Dugong
 Dugong, D. dugon

Order: Chiroptera (bats) 

The bats' most distinguishing feature is that their forelimbs are developed as wings, making them the only mammals capable of flight. Bat species account for about 20% of all mammals.

Family: Pteropodidae (flying foxes, Old World fruit bats)
Subfamily: Pteropodinae
Genus: Pteropus
 Mauritian flying fox, P. niger 
 Rodrigues flying fox, P. rodricensis 
 Small Mauritian flying fox, P. subniger 
Family: Molossidae
Genus: Mormopterus
 Natal free-tailed bat, M. acetabulosus 
Family: Emballonuridae
Genus: Taphozous
 Mauritian tomb bat, T. mauritianus

Order: Cetacea (whales) 

The order Cetacea includes whales, dolphins and porpoises. They are the mammals most fully adapted to aquatic life with a spindle-shaped nearly hairless body, protected by a thick layer of blubber, and forelimbs and tail modified to provide propulsion underwater.

Suborder: Mysticeti
Family: Balaenopteridae
Subfamily: Balaenopterinae
Genus: Balaenoptera
 Common minke whale, Balaenoptera acutorostrata LC
 Antarctic minke whale, Balaenoptera bonaerensis DD
 Bryde's whale, Balaenoptera edeni DD
 Southern sei whale, Balaenoptera borealis schlegelii EN
 Southern fin whale, Balaenoptera physalus quoyi EN
 Pygmy blue whale, Balaenoptera musculus brevicauda DD
 Southern blue whale, Balaenoptera musculus intermedia EN
Family: Megapterinae
Genus: Megaptera
 Humpback whale, Megaptera novaeangliae LC
Family: Balaenidae
Genus: Eubalaena
 Southern right whale, Eubalaena australis LC (rarer on today's Mauritius)
Suborder: Odontoceti
Family: Physeteridae
Genus: Physeter
 Sperm whale, Physeter macrocephalus VU
Family: Kogiidae
Genus: Kogia
 Pygmy sperm whale, Kogia breviceps DD
 Dwarf sperm whale, Kogia sima DD
Family: Ziphidae
Genus: Indopacetus
 Tropical bottlenose whale, Indopacetus pacificus DD
Genus: Ziphius
 Cuvier's beaked whale, Ziphius cavirostris DD
Subfamily: Hyperoodontinae
Genus: Mesoplodon
 Blainville's beaked whale, Mesoplodon densirostris DD
 Gray's beaked whale, Mesoplodon grayi DD
 Hector's beaked whale, Mesoplodon hectori DD
 Layard's beaked whale, Mesoplodon layardii DD
 True's beaked whale, Mesoplodon mirus DD
Superfamily: Delphinoidea
Family: Delphinidae (marine dolphins)
Genus: Steno
 Rough-toothed dolphin, Steno bredanensis LC
Genus: Grampus
 Risso's dolphin, Grampus griseus DD
Genus: Globicephala
 Short-finned pilot whale, Globicephala macrorhynchus DD
Genus: Sousa
 Indian humpback dolphin, Sousa plumbea NT
Genus: Tursiops
 Indo-Pacific bottlenose dolphin, Tursiops aduncus DD
 Common bottlenose dolphin, Tursiops truncatus LC
Genus: Stenella
 Pantropical spotted dolphin, Stenella attenuata LC
 Striped dolphin, Stenella coeruleoalba LC
 Spinner dolphin, Stenella longirostris DD
Genus: Delphinus
 Long-beaked common dolphin, Delphinus capensis DD
Genus: Lagenodelphis
 Fraser's dolphin, Lagenodelphis hosei DD
Genus: Peponocephala
 Melon-headed whale, Peponocephala electra DD
Genus: Pseudorca
 False killer whale, Pseudorca crassidens DD
Genus: Feresa
 Pygmy killer whale, Feresa attenuata DD
Genus: Orcinus
 Orca, Orcinus orca DD

Order: Carnivora (carnivorans) 

There are over 260 species of carnivorans, the majority of which feed primarily on meat. They have a characteristic skull shape and dentition.
Suborder: Feliformia
Family: Herpestidae
Genus: Urva
 Small Indian mongoose, U. auropunctatus  introduced
Suborder: Caniformia
Family: Phocidae (earless seals)
Genus: Mirounga
 Southern elephant seal, Mirounga leonina LR/lc

See also
List of chordate orders
Lists of mammals by region
List of prehistoric mammals
Mammal classification
List of mammals described in the 2000s

Notes

References
 

Mauritius
Mauritius
Mammals